Giugno is the Italian word for the month of June. It is also an Italian surname. Notable people with the surname include:

Francesco Giugno (1577–1621), Italian painter
Giuseppe di Giugno (born 1937), Italian physicist
Nicolas di Giugno (born 1988), Belgian footballer

Italian-language surnames